Isvara Puri was a monk who was a disciple of Madhavendra Puri from the Madhva Sampradaya. He met Chaitanya at Gaya, India, whereupon Mahaprabhu requested Puri to be his guru. The latter graciously agreed and accepted Mahaprabhu as his disciple several days later, initiating him into the Gopal-mantra.

Krishnadasa Kaviraja has described in Shri Chaitanya Charitamrita that:
 
the first sprout of the desire tree of devotion was manifested in the person of 
Shri Madhavendra Puri,and that that sprout developed into a sapling in the person of Shri Ishvar Puri. 
Then, in the person of Shri Chaitanya Mahaprabhu, Who was also the gardener Himself, 
that the sapling became the trunk of an enormous tree-the desire tree of devotion. - (C. C. Adi 9.10-11)

Life

Birth
According to Shri Chaitanya Charitamrita :
 Shri Ishvara Puri appeared in this world on the full moon day of the month of Jyestha. He served his guru, Shri Madhavendra Puri, very faithfully, especially during the end of Shri Puripada's life." – (C. C. Antya 8.26)

Mahaprabhu Taking Initiation From Ishvara Puri
During a travel pilgrimage visit, Ishvara Puri met Chaitanya Mahaprabhu in Gaya.

After immediately meeting Chaitanya Mahaprabhu addressed Ishvara Puri as, 

Shrila Ishvara Puri replied, 

Hearing this, Mahaprabhu bowed His head and smilingly replied, 

On another day Mahaprabhu approached Shri Ishvara Puri and requested that he initiate Him with the divine mantra. 

Thereafter Shrila Ishvara Puri initiated Chaitanya Mahaprabhu with the divine Hare Krishna Mantra.

Ishvara Puri Visit to Mahaprabhu place
One morning Shrila Ishvara Puri came to where Mahaprabhu was staying. Mahaprabhu was extremely pleased to see him and after offering His obeisances He invited him to stay for lunch. Ishvara Puri replied that, "Being able to accept foodstuffs from Your hand is a matter of great fortune for me." Mahaprabhu Himself cooked and then very carefully served His guru the Prasadam. Afterwards He smeared sandalwood paste on his body and put a garland of flowers around his neck. Thus the Supreme Lord Himself taught how one should serve his guru. Without serving the great Devotees, it is not possible to receive love of Godhead. Service to the guru is the door to devotion.

On His return from Gaya, Mahaprabhu came by way of Kumarhatta, the birthplace of His guru, and began to roll on the ground in ecstasy there, as the ground became wet with His tears. Finally He collected some dust from that holy place and bound it in the corner of His upper garment, saying, "This dust is as dear to me as My life." then he set out for Navadwipa.

Thereafter Mahaprabhu accepted sannyasa and by the order of His mother came to live at Jagannath Puri. By this time Ishvara Puri had already left this world. He sent two of his disciples Shri Govinda and Kashishvara brahmacharis to serve the Lord at Nilachala.

References

See also
Gaudiya Vaishnavism

Gaudiya religious leaders